A campo is a city square in Venice, Italy.

List of campos

Cannaregio 
 Campo Sant'Alvise
 Campo dei Gesuiti
 Campo del Ghetto Novo

Castello 
 campo Bandiera e Moro   
 Campo Santa Marina
 Campo Santi Giovanni e Paolo  
 Campo San Pietro di Castello

Dorsoduro 
 Campo Santa Margherita  
 Campo San Trovaso (Dorsoduro)
 Campo della Salute (Dorsoduro)

Santa Croce  
 Campo San Simeon Grande  
 Campo dei Tolentini

San Marco 
 Campo Manin  
 Campo Sant'Angelo
 Campo San Luca
 Campo Santo Stefano 
 Campo San Bartolomeo

San Polo  
 Campo dei Frari  
 Campo San Polo  
 Campo Rocco

External links